Pim weights were polished stones about 15 mm (5/8 inch) diameter, equal to about two-thirds of a Hebrew shekel.  Many specimens have been found since their initial discovery early in the 20th century, and each one weighs about 7.6 grams, compared to 11.5 grams of a shekel. Its name comes from the inscription seen across the top of its dome shape: the Phoenician letters 𐤐𐤉‬‬𐤌‬ (Hebrew , transliterated pym).

Impact
Prior to the discovery of the weights by archaeologists, scholars did not know how to translate the word  (pîm) in 1 Samuel 13:21. Robert Alexander Stewart Macalister's excavations at Gezer (1902-1905 and 1907-1909) were published in 1912 with an illustration showing one such weight, which Macalister compared to another published in 1907 by Charles Simon Clermont-Ganneau.

Here is the 1611 translation of the King James Version of the Bible:

Yet they had a file for the mattocks, and for the coulters, and for the forks, and for the axes, and to sharpen the goads.

The 1982 New King James Version rendered it:

And the charge for a sharpening was a pim for the plowshares, the mattocks, the forks, and the axes, and to set the points of the goads.

Photos

See also

 Ancient Hebrew units of measurement
 Biblical archaeology
List of artifacts significant to the Bible

References

Sources 
 
 

Archaeological artefact types
Mass